S.T. Gordon (born April 18, 1959) is an American former professional boxer held the WBC and Lineal cruiserweight titles from 1982 to 1983.

Professional boxing career
Gordon became a professional boxer in 1977. He faced undefeated heavyweight prospect Gerry Cooney in 1978 but lost via a fourth-round disqualification. In 1981 he beat aging contender Yaqui Lopez for the North American Boxing Federation cruiserweight title. The next year he won the Lineal and WBC cruiserweight titles with a technical knockout victory over Carlos De León. The champion refused to defend the belt against the number one contender David Pearce in his first defence in the United States, and could not defend his belt in Great Britain because of the BBBoC reluctance to recognise the Cruiserweight division in the UK.

S. T. Gordon went on to defend the title once and also won a heavyweight bout against future titlist Trevor Berbick before losing his cruiserweight title in 1983 in a rematch with De Leon. He retired after the loss but had a brief comeback in 1987 but was knocked out in the first round by Dwain Bonds.

Professional boxing record

See also
List of cruiserweight boxing champions
List of WBA world champions

References

External links
 
 S. T. Gordon - CBZ Profile

Cruiserweight boxers
Boxers from Washington (state)
1959 births
Living people
World Boxing Council champions
People from Pasco, Washington
American male boxers